Pente Vryses is a village of the Lagkadas municipality. Before the 2011 local government reform it was part of the municipality of Vertiskos. The 2011 census recorded 332 inhabitants in the village. Pente Vryses is a part of the community of Exalofos.

See also
 List of settlements in the Thessaloniki regional unit

References

Populated places in Thessaloniki (regional unit)